Jones Kusi-Asare (born 21 May 1980) is a Swedish-Ghanaian former professional footballer who played as a forward.

Career 
He started his career at Vasalunds IF in the Stockholm suburb of Solna. He was signed by Djurgården in 1998 and made his Allsvenskan against IFK Norrköping on 11 April 1999. He struggled in the first two seasons but in 2001 he became their top goalscorer despite the fact that he often started on the bench. After spells at Grazer AK in Austria and Denizlispor in Turkey, he returned to Swedish football in 2003 when he signed for Landskrona BoIS. After two seasons there (2003 and 2004), he returned to Djurgården.

In December 2008, it was announced that he would be playing at Esbjerg fB starting from spring 2009 and signs a contract between 30 June 2011. At 1 September 2010 Esbjerg fB and AaB agreed that Kusi-Asare would join AaB on a loan-contract until 31 December 2010. On 26 January 2011 Jones signed with Assyriska FF from Södertälje Sweden.

Career statistics

Honours

 Djurgårdens IF
 Allsvenskan: 2005

References

External links
 Esbjerg fB profile 
 
 
  

1980 births
Living people
Naturalized citizens of Sweden
Swedish people of Ghanaian descent
Swedish footballers
Ghanaian footballers
Association football forwards
Vasalunds IF players
Djurgårdens IF Fotboll players
Grazer AK players
Denizlispor footballers
Landskrona BoIS players
Esbjerg fB players
AaB Fodbold players
Assyriska FF players
Allsvenskan players
Superettan players
Austrian Football Bundesliga players
Süper Lig players
Danish Superliga players
Swedish expatriate footballers
Ghanaian expatriate footballers
Expatriate footballers in Austria
Ghanaian expatriate sportspeople in Austria
Expatriate footballers in Turkey
Ghanaian expatriate sportspeople in Turkey
Expatriate men's footballers in Denmark
Ghanaian expatriate sportspeople in Denmark
Footballers from Kumasi